The Don Francisco Galindo House, known locally as the Galindo House and Gardens, is a 19th-century house in Concord, California built in 1856 by Francisco Galindo and his wife, Maria Dolores Manuela (Pacheco) Galindo, daughter of Salvio Pacheco who was the grantee of Rancho Monte del Diablo.

The house is one of the few remaining Victorian ranch houses in Contra Costa County. In 1875 it underwent significant remodeling resulting in an enlarged basement, first floor and second floor. It was around this time that Francisco and Maria's oldest son, Juan "John" Galindo, and his bride, Marina "Sarah" (Amador) Galindo, moved into the house. After Juan and Marina's eldest child, Frederick, and Catherine (Hittman) Galindo were married in 1911, title was transferred to the next generation.

Following Catherine Galindo's death in 1966, the house was maintained by her children Harold, Ruth, and Leonora. Ruth Galindo, the last direct descendant of the family, resided in the home until her death in December 1999.

In October 2001, following a series of public workshops and meetings, the City of Concord adopted a Master Plan for the Galindo House, prepared by the historic preservation architectural firm Page & Turnbull of San Francisco, including a Museum Operating Plan.

In September 2010, ownership of the Galindo House and property transferred from the City of Concord to the Concord Historical Society, which spent the next two years renovating the house and opened it to the public in 2012.

In May 2013, the Society moved the city's Masonic Temple (which had been dedicated in October 1928) from its location at 1765 Galindo St. to the Galindo House property, facing Clayton Road, to become part of the Society's historical resource center and meeting facility.

See also
 National Register of Historic Places listings in Contra Costa County, California
 Don Salvio Pacheco Adobe

References

External links
 City of Concord page
 Concord Historical Society
 A peek inside the Galindo House

Historic house museums in California
Houses completed in 1856
Houses in Contra Costa County, California
Houses on the National Register of Historic Places in California
Italianate architecture in California
Museums in Contra Costa County, California
National Register of Historic Places in Contra Costa County, California
Parks in Contra Costa County, California
Buildings and structures in Concord, California